CKKN-FM, branded as 101.3 The River, is a Canadian radio station, which broadcasts a hot adult contemporary format at 101.3 FM in Prince George, British Columbia. The station is owned by the Jim Pattison Group, which also owns sister stations CKDV-FM and CKPG-TV.

History
The station was launched in 1981 by Q Broadcasting, as a country station with the call sign CIOI and the brand name Country 101. Q Broadcasting sold its holdings to Monarch Broadcasting in 1990.  Monarch converted the station to the CKKN call sign in 1995, and to its current format in 1999. The stations were in turn sold to Pattison in 2000, and became hot adult contemporary Hits FM at that time.  By 2004, the station shifted to adult contemporary; ratings remained dismal from its adult top 40 format after the switch. It returned to hot adult contemporary as The River by 2005.

Transmitters

Former logo

References

External links
 101.3 The River
 
 

Kkn
Kkn
Kkn
Radio stations established in 1981
1981 establishments in British Columbia